Gisborne District or the Gisborne Region (Māori: Te Tairāwhiti or Te Tai Rāwhiti) is a local government area of northeastern New Zealand. It is governed by Gisborne District Council, a unitary authority (with the combined powers of a district and regional council). It is named after its largest settlement, the city of Gisborne. The region is also commonly referred to as the East Coast.

The region is commonly divided into the East Cape and Poverty Bay. It is bounded by mountain ranges to the west, rugged country to the south, and faces east onto the Pacific Ocean.

Name and history

Prior to the late 19th century, the area was known as Tūranga. However, as the Gisborne town site was laid out in 1870, the name changed to Gisborne, after the Colonial Secretary William Gisborne, and to avoid confusion with the town of Tauranga.

The region was formerly known as the East Coast, although the region is often divided into the East Coast proper (or East Cape), north of the city, and Poverty Bay, the area including and surrounding the city. The region is also sometimes referred to as the East Cape, although that also refers specifically to the promontory at the northeastern extremity. More recently, it has been called Eastland, although that can also include Ōpōtiki in the eastern Bay of Plenty to the northwest, and Wairoa to the south.

Its Māori name Te Tai Rāwhiti means the Coast of the Sunrise, reflecting the fact that it is the first part of the New Zealand mainland to see the sun rise. Gisborne District Council styles the name as Te Tairāwhiti.

Geography
The region is located in the northeastern corner of the North Island. It ranges from the Wharerata Hills in the south, which divide it from Wairoa District in Hawke's Bay, to Lottin Point in the north. The western boundary runs along the Raukumara Range, which separates it from Ōpōtiki District. In the southwest, its boundary runs along the western edge of Te Urewera.

It is sparsely inhabited and isolated, with small settlements mainly clinging to small bays along the eastern shore, including Tokomaru Bay and Tolaga Bay. Its population is  Three-quarters of the population –  – lives in the city of Gisborne. No other settlements have a population of over 1000; the largest are the towns of Tolaga Bay and Ruatoria, each with populations of over 800 in 2001.

Inland, the land is rough, predominantly forested, hill country. A spine of rough ridges dominates the centre of the region, culminating in the impressive bulk of the 1752 metre Mount Hikurangi in Waiapu Valley in the region's northeast. Hikurangi is the fifth highest mountain in the North Island, and the highest that is not a volcano. Regarded as sacred by Māori, there is some justification to the claims that this is the first mountain to see the sun in summer.

The region's population has higher than the national average proportion of Māori – over 50% in some areas – and maintains strong ties to both Māori tradition and the iwi and marae structure. The predominant iwi are Ngāti Porou, Rongowhakaata, Ngāi Tāmanuhiri and Te Aitanga-a-Māhaki.

2007 earthquake 

At 8:55pm (NZDT) on 20 December 2007, the Gisborne region was hit by an earthquake of Richter magnitude 6.8, centred in the Hikurangi Trench which is a part of the Hikurangi Margin. The earthquake was situated 50 km southeast of Gisborne at a depth of 40 km. Mercalli intensities of 7-8 were experienced, with three buildings substantially collapsed in the central business district and others experiencing some structural damage. One death was reported (a heart attack of an elderly woman, sustained during the quake) plus minor injuries.

Climate
The region is sheltered by high country to the west and has a dry, sunny climate. It has a yearly average of 2,200 sunshine hours. The annual rainfall varies from about 1000mm near the coast to over 2500mm in higher inland country. Typical maxima range from 20 to 28 °C in summer and 10-16 °C in winter. Minima vary from 10 to 16 °C in summer to 0-8 °C in winter.

Demographics

Gisborne District had a population of 47,517 at the 2018 New Zealand census, an increase of 3,864 people (8.9%) since the 2013 census, and an increase of 3,057 people (6.9%) since the 2006 census. There were 16,410 households, comprising 23,394 males and 24,126 females, giving a sex ratio of 0.97 males per female. The median age was 37.0 years (compared with 37.4 years nationally), with 11,283 people (23.7%) aged under 15 years, 8,766 (18.4%) aged 15 to 29, 20,124 (42.4%) aged 30 to 64, and 7,344 (15.5%) aged 65 or older.

Ethnicities were 58.1% European/Pākehā, 52.9% Māori, 4.5% Pacific peoples, 2.8% Asian, and 1.4% other ethnicities. People may identify with more than one ethnicity.

The percentage of people born overseas was 9.7, compared with 27.1% nationally.

Although some people chose not to answer the census's question about religious affiliation, 48.2% had no religion, 36.4% were Christian, 4.6% had Māori religious beliefs, 0.4% were Hindu, 0.2% were Muslim, 0.3% were Buddhist and 1.6% had other religions.

Of those at least 15 years old, 5,382 (14.9%) people had a bachelor's or higher degree, and 7,944 (21.9%) people had no formal qualifications. The median income was $25,900, compared with $31,800 nationally. 3,945 people (10.9%) earned over $70,000 compared to 17.2% nationally. The employment status of those at least 15 was that 17,064 (47.1%) people were employed full-time, 5,451 (15.0%) were part-time, and 1,872 (5.2%) were unemployed.

In the 2018 census, 77.6% of the population could speak in one language only, 18.9% in two languages and 1.1% in three or more languages.

Urban areas 
It is home to % of the district's population.

Other towns and settlements in the Gisborne district include:

 Hicks Bay
 Manutuke
 Patutahi
 Ruatoria
 Te Araroa
 Te Karaka
 Tokomaru Bay
 Tolaga Bay

Economy
The subnational gross domestic product (GDP) of the Gisborne region was estimated at NZ$2.16 billion in the year to March 2019, 0.7% of New Zealand's national GDP. The regional GDP per capita was estimated at $44,004 in the same period.

Government
The district is governed by Gisborne District Council, a unitary territorial authority, meaning that it performs the functions of a regional council as well as those of a territorial authority (a district or city). It is constituted as both the Gisborne District and the Gisborne Region. It replaced Gisborne City, Cook County, Waiapu County and Waikohu County in a major nationwide reform of local government in 1989.

Arts

There are a number of notable creative people from the Gisborne region including writer Witi Ihimaera, opera singer Dame Kiri Te Kanawa and actor George Henare.

An annual arts festival began in 2019 called Te Tairāwhiti Arts Festival. In 2020 this included a series of light installations along the river in Gisborne city showcasing ten local artists.

Sport
The region is represented in rugby union by the East Coast Rugby Football Union and the 
Poverty Bay Rugby Football Union.

See also
 2006 Tonga earthquake
 List of marae in the Gisborne District
 List of people from Gisborne
 List of schools in the Gisborne District

References

External links

 Gisborne District Council official website
 Tourism Eastland

 
Wine regions of New Zealand